The State Scenic Highway System in the U.S. state of California is a list of highways, mainly state highways, that have been designated by the California Department of Transportation (Caltrans) as scenic highways. They are marked by the state flower, a California poppy, inside either a rectangle for state-maintained highways or a pentagon for county highways.

The California State Legislature makes state highways eligible for designation as a scenic highway, listing them in the Streets and Highways Code, sections 260-284. For a highway to then be declared scenic by Caltrans, the local government with jurisdiction over abutting land must adopt a "scenic corridor protection program" that limits development, outdoor advertising, and earthmoving, and Caltrans must agree that it meets the criteria. The desire to create such a designation has at times been in conflict with the property rights of abutters, for example on State Route 174.

Any county highway that is believed to have outstanding scenic qualities is considered eligible, and the county with jurisdiction must follow Caltrans' same approval process as state highways to be declared scenic.

California Historic Parkways

California Historic Parkways are defined in the Streets and Highways Code, sections 280-284, as a subset of the State Scenic Highway System. Such historic parkways must have been constructed prior to 1945, and have been determined by either Caltrans or the Office of Historic Preservation in the California Department of Parks and Recreation to have historical significance. They must not at time of designation be traversed by more than 40,000 vehicles per day on an annual daily average basis. They also must be "bounded on one or both sides by federal, state, or local parkland, Native American lands or monuments, or other open space, greenbelt areas, natural habitat or wildlife preserves, or similar acreage used for or dedicated to historical or recreational uses".

State Route 110
Arroyo Seco Parkway (also a National Scenic Byway), the first freeway in the Western U.S. 
 Designated January 1, 1994, in Los Angeles County: Figueroa Street/Avenue 26 in Los Angeles to Glenarm Street in Pasadena
State Route 163
Cabrillo Parkway, historic parkway through Balboa Park in San Diego
Designated September 27, 2002, in San Diego County: Balboa Park

List of eligible and designated scenic state highways

State Route 1
I-5 in San Juan Capistrano to SR 19 in Long Beach
State Route 128 between State Route 1 near Albion and Winters
SR 187 near Santa Monica to US 101 near El Rio
US 101 at Las Cruces to SR 246 in Lompoc
 Cabrillo Highway, scenic drive through the rocky headlands near the Pacific coast
Designated December 14, 1971, in Santa Barbara County: US 101 at Las Cruces to Lompoc
SR 227  near Oceano to US 101 in Pismo Beach
US 101 in San Luis Obispo to SR 35 in Daly City
San Luis Obispo North Coast Byway (also an All-American Road), scenic drive along the Pacific coast
Designated August 13, 1999, in San Luis Obispo County: San Luis Obispo to Monterey County
 Big Sur Coast Highway (also an All-American Road), scenic drive along the Pacific coast
Designated June 7, 1965, in Monterey County: San Luis Obispo County to Carmel River
Designated May 21, 1970, in Monterey County: Carmel River to SR 68 in Monterey
 Cabrillo Highway, scenic drive along the Pacific coast
Designated June 25, 1976, in San Mateo County: Santa Cruz County to Half Moon Bay
SR 35 to US 101 in San Francisco
US 101 near Marin City to US 101 at Leggett
State Route 2
I-210 in La Cañada Flintridge to SR 138 near Wrightwood
Part of the Angeles Crest Scenic Byway (also a National Forest Scenic Byway), runs through the San Gabriel Mountains with scenic views of the Los Angeles Basin and the Mojave Desert
Designated May 12, 1971, in Los Angeles County: La Cañada Flintridge to San Bernardino County
State Route 3
SR 36 near Peanut to Montague
State Route 4
SR 160 in Antioch to  SR 84 near Brentwood
SR 49 in Angels Camp to SR 89 near Markleeville
Ebbetts Pass Scenic Byway (also a National Scenic Byway), crossing of the Sierra Nevada via Ebbetts Pass past giant sequoia groves
Designated November 9, 1971, in Calaveras County: Arnold to Alpine County
Designated September 14, 1970, in Alpine County: Calaveras County to SR 89 near Markleeville
Interstate 5
Mexico to SR 75 in southern San Diego
SR 75 near Downtown San Diego to SR 74 in San Juan Capistrano
I-210 in Sylmar to SR 126 in Santa Clarita
SR 152 near Los Banos to I-580 near Tracy
West Side Freeway, follows the western edge of the agricultural areas of the Central Valley, paralleling the California Aqueduct and the Delta–Mendota Canal
Designated October 25, 1968, in Merced County: SR 152 near Los Banos to Stanislaus County
Designated October 25, 1968, in Stanislaus County: Merced County to San Joaquin County
Designated June 7, 1974, in San Joaquin County: Stanislaus County to I-580 near Tracy
SR 44 in Redding to Shasta Lake
SR 89 near Mount Shasta to US 97 in Weed
SR 3 in Yreka to Oregon
Interstate 8
Sunset Cliffs Boulevard in San Diego to SR 98 near Ocotillo
State Route 9
SR 1 in Santa Cruz to SR 17 in Los Gatos
Saratoga-Los Gatos Road, scenic drive through suburban areas in and near Saratoga at the foot of the Santa Cruz Mountains
Designated October 18, 1979, in Santa Clara County: SR 35 at Saratoga Gap to Saratoga Sunnyvale Road in Saratoga
Designated May 2, 1968, in Santa Clara County: Saratoga Sunnyvale Road in Saratoga to Los Gatos
Interstate 10
SR 38 in Redlands to SR 62 near White Water
State Route 12
US 101 in Santa Rosa to SR 121 near Sonoma
Valley of the Moon Highway, passes through various wineries and vineyards of Sonoma Valley
Designated December 17, 1974, in Sonoma County: Santa Rosa to Agua Caliente
State Route 13
SR 24 in Oakland to I-580 in Oakland
State Route 14
SR 58 near Mojave to US 395 near Little Lake
Interstate 15
SR 76 near Pala to SR 91 in Corona
SR 58 in Barstow to SR 127 at Baker
State Route 16
SR 20 near Rumsey to Capay
State Route 17
SR 1 in Santa Cruz to SR 9 in Los Gatos
State Route 18
SR 138 at Crestline to SR 247 at Lucerne Valley
State Route 20
SR 1 in Fort Bragg to SR 16 near Rumsey
SR 49 in Grass Valley to I-80 near Emigrant Gap
Part of the Yuba-Donner Scenic Byway (also a National Forest Scenic Byway), scenic drive through the pine forests of Tahoe National Forest
Designated March 12, 1971, in Nevada County: Relief to Bear Valley
State Route 24
Caldecott Tunnel near Oakland to I-680 in Walnut Creek
Route 24, scenic drive through the rolling hills in Orinda and Lafayette with a view of Mount Diablo going eastbound
Designated October 22, 1982, in Contra Costa County: Caldecott Tunnel near Oakland to I-680 in Walnut Creek
State Route 25
SR 198 near Priest Valley to SR 156 near Hollister
State Route 27
SR 1 at Topanga Beach to Mulholland Drive in Los Angeles
Topanga Canyon Boulevard, runs through Topanga Canyon and part of Topanga State Park
Designated March 22, 2017, in Los Angeles County: Topanga Canyon
State Route 28
SR 89 in Tahoe City to Nevada
State Route 29
SR 37 in Vallejo to SR 221 near Napa
Trancas Street in Napa to SR 20 near Upper Lake
State Route 33
US 101 in Ventura to SR 166 near Cuyama
Jacinto Reyes Scenic Byway (also a National Forest Scenic Byway), scenic drive through Los Padres National Forest past pine forests and semi-desert landscapes
Designated February 18, 1972, in Ventura County: Wheeler Springs to near Sespe Gorge
Designated July 11, 1988, in Ventura County: near Sespe Gorge to near Pine Mountain Ridge Road
Designated February 18, 1972, in Ventura County: near Pine Mountain Ridge Road to near Lockwood Valley Road
Designated July 11, 1988, in Ventura County: near Lockwood Valley Road to Santa Barbara County
State Route 35
SR 17 near Redwood Estates to SR 1 in San Francisco
Skyline Boulevard, runs along the ridge of the Santa Cruz Mountains
Designated September 13, 1968, in San Mateo County: Santa Cruz County to near Page Mill Road
Designated January 22, 1968, in San Mateo County: near Page Mill Road to SR 92 near Crystal Springs Reservoir
State Route 36
US 101 near Fortuna to SR 3 near Peanut
State Route 37 
SR 251 near Nicasio to SR 29 in Vallejo
State Route 38
I-10 in Redlands to SR 18 at Big Bear Dam
Rim of the World Scenic Byway (also a National Forest Scenic Byway), drive through the San Bernardino Mountains with scenic views of forested mountains and desert areas
Designated March 19, 1968, in San Bernardino County: Santa Ana River to State Lane near Sugarloaf
State Route 39
I-210 in Azusa to SR 2 at Islip Saddle
Interstate 40
Barstow to Needles
State Route 41
SR 1 in Morro Bay to US 101 in Atascadero
SR 46 near Cholame to SR 33 at Reef Station
SR 49 at Oakhurst to Yosemite National Park
State Route 44
I-5 in Redding to SR 89 near Old Station
State Route 46
SR 1 near Cambria to SR 41 near Cholame
State Route 49
SR 41 at Oakhurst to SR 89 at Sattley
Part of the Yuba-Donner Scenic Byway (also a National Forest Scenic Byway), scenic drive through the Yuba River canyon past several historic mining communities of the California Gold Rush
Designated July  14, 1971, in Sierra County: Yuba County to Yuba Pass
U.S. Route 50
SR 49 in Placerville to Nevada
Route 50, crossing of the Sierra Nevada via the American River Canyon and Echo Summit towards Lake Tahoe
Designated April 2, 1985, in El Dorado County: Placerville Drive in Placerville (west of SR 49) to Echo Summit
Designated April 1, 1986, in El Dorado County: Echo Summit to South Lake Tahoe
State Route 52
I-5 in San Diego to SR 67 in Santee
Route 52, runs along the northern boundary of Mission Trails Regional Park with scenic views of Cowles Mountain
Designated February 2, 2016, in San Diego County: near Santo Road to near Mast Boulevard in San Diego
State Route 53
SR 29 at Lower Lake to SR 20 near Clearlake
State Route 57
SR 90 in Brea to SR 60 near Industry
State Route 58
SR 14 near Mojave to I-15 in Barstow
State Route 62
I-10 near White Water to Arizona
Twentynine Palms Highway, runs through scenic high desert country and Joshua Tree National Monument
Designated September 14, 1972, in Riverside County: I-10 near White Water to San Bernardino County
State Route 68
Monterey to US 101 in Salinas
Route 68, runs through areas of oak, sycamore, and pine trees east of Monterey
Designated June 19, 1968, in Monterey County: SR 1 in Monterey to Salinas River
State Route 70
SR 149 at Wicks Corner to SR 89 at Blairsden
State Route 71
SR 91 near Corona to SR 83 in Chino Hills
State Route 74 
I-5 in San Juan Capistrano to SR 111 in Palm Desert, California
Part of the Pines to Palms Scenic Byway (also a National Forest Scenic Byway), scenic drive from the forests of San Bernardino National Forest to Mojave Desert areas
Designated October 18, 1971, in Riverside County: San Bernardino National Forest west boundary to SR 111 in Palm Desert
State Route 75
I-5 in southern San Diego to I-5 near Downtown San Diego
Silver Strand Highway, scenic drive along the Silver Strand and across the San Diego-Coronado Bridge
Designated March 4, 1974, in San Diego County: Imperial Beach to Avenida del Sol in Coronado
Designated February 17, 1969, in San Diego County: San Diego-Coronado Bridge
State Route 76
I-5 in Oceanside to SR 79 near Lake Henshaw
State Route 78
SR 79 at Santa Ysabel to SR 86 near Salton City
Anza-Borrego Desert State Park Road, traverses the low desert landscapes of Anza-Borrego Desert State Park
Designated December 14, 1971, in San Diego County: Anza-Borrego Desert State Park
State Route 79
I-8 near Descanso to SR 371 at Aguanga
Interstate 80
I-280  in San Francisco to SR 61  in Oakland
SR 20 near Emigrant Gap to Nevada
State Route 84
SR 238 in Fremont to I-680 near Sunol
Niles Canyon Road, runs through Niles Canyon
Designated July 27, 2007, in Alameda County: SR 238 in Fremont to I-680 near Sunol
State Route 88
SR 49 in Jackson to Nevada
Carson Pass Highway, (also a National Forest Scenic Byway), crossing of the Sierra Nevada via Carson Pass
Designated July 30, 1986, in Amador County: Dew Drop Ranger Station to Alpine County
Designated September 14, 1970, in Alpine County: Amador County to Nevada
State Route 89
US 395 near Coleville to I-5 near Mount Shasta
Monitor Pass and Luther Pass Highways, and Lake Tahoe Road, scenic drive through the forests of Sierra Nevada and along the southwestern side of Lake Tahoe
Designated November 9, 1971, in Mono County: Slinkard Valley to Alpine County
Designated 1970-09-14 in Alpine County: Mono County to El Dorado County
Designated April 1, 1986, in El Dorado County: Alpine County to Placer County
State Route 91
SR 55 in Anaheim to I-15 in Corona
Riverside Freeway, runs along the banks of the Santa Ana River past riparian areas and chaparral vegetation
Designated Novembere 15, 1971, in Orange County: SR 55 in Anaheim to Anaheim east limit
State Route 92
SR 1 in Half Moon Bay to I-280 near Crystal Springs Reservoir
State Route 94
SR 125 near Spring Valley to I-8 near Jacumba
State Route 96
SR 299 at Willow Creek to I-5 near Yreka
U.S. Route 97
I-5 in Weed to Oregon
U.S. Route 101
SR 27 in Woodland Hills to SR 46 in Paso Robles
 Gaviota Coast segment of the El Camino Real, scenic drive along the Pacific coast and through the Santa Ynez Mountains
Designated December 13, 2016, in Santa Barbara County: Goleta west limit to SR 1 in Las Cruces
Golden Gate Bridge to SR 1 near Marin City
SR 1 at Leggett to US 199 near Crescent City
Redwood Highway, runs through the redwood forests of Del Norte Coast Redwoods State Park
Designated February 18, 1970, in Del Norte County: Del Norte Coast Redwoods State Park
SR 197 near Smith River to Oregon
State Route 108
SR 49 in Sonora to US 395 near Bridgeport
State Route 111
Bombay Beach to SR 195 at Mecca
SR 74 in Palm Desert to I-10 near White Water
State Route 116
SR 1 near Jenner to US 101 in Cotati
Route 116, scenic drive along the Russian River
Designated September 20, 1988, in Sonoma County: SR 1 near Jenner to Sebastopol east limit
State Route 118
SR 23 in Moorpark to De Soto Avenue in Los Angeles
State Route 120
Yosemite National Park to US 395 near Mono Lake
State Route 121
SR 37 near Sears Point to SR 12 near Sonoma
SR 221 in Napa to Trancas Street near Napa
State Route 125
SR 94 near Spring Valley to I-8 in La Mesa
Route 125, passes through scenic areas west of Mount Helix
Designated March 1, 1971, in San Diego County: SR 94 near Spring Valley to I-8 in La Mesa
State Route 126
SR 150 in Santa Paula to I-5 in Santa Clarita
State Route 127
I-15 at Baker to Nevada
State Route 138
SR 2 near Wrightwood to SR 18 at Crestline
State Route 139
SR 299 near Canby to Oregon
State Route 140
SR 49 at Mariposa to Yosemite National Park
Route 140, scenic drive through the Merced River Canyon to Yosemite National Park
Designated August 30, 1991, in Mariposa County: Mariposa to El Portal
State Route 142
Brea to Peyton Drive in Chino Hills
State Route 146
Pinnacles National Park to SR 25 near Paicines
State Route 150
US 101 in Carpinteria to SR 126 in Santa Paula
State Route 151
Shasta Dam to I-5 in Shasta Lake
Shasta Dam Boulevard,  runs along the slope of a ridge overlooking Shasta Lake and the Sacramento River
Designated September 9, 1981, in Shasta County: Shasta Dam to Shasta Lake
State Route 152
SR 1 in Watsonville to Hecker Pass
SR 156 near San Felipe to I-5 near Los Banos
Pacheco Pass Road, runs along the northern and eastern shore of the San Luis Reservoir, and through the western edge of the Central Valley
Designated June 19, 1970, in Merced County: Santa Clara County to I-5 near Los Banos
State Route 154
US 101 near Los Olivos to US 101 in Santa Barbara
San Marcos Pass Road, passes through the Santa Ynez Valley and over San Marcos Pass in the Santa Ynez Mountains
Designated November 22, 1968, in Santa Barbara County: US 101 near Los Olivos to US 101 in Santa Barbara
State Route 156
SR 1 near Castroville to SR 152 near San Felipe
Route 156, traverses agricultural areas, particularly artichoke crops, between Castroville (nicknamed the "Artichoke Center of the World") and Prunedale
Designated September 14, 1972, in Monterey County: Castroville to US 101 near Prunedale
State Route 158
US 395 at June Lake Junction to US 395 at Grant Lake Junction
State Route 160
SR 4 in Antioch to Sacramento
River Road, runs along the Sacramento River in the Sacramento–San Joaquin River Delta
Designated October 3, 1969, in Sacramento County: Contra Costa County to Sacramento
State Route 161
US 97 near Dorris to SR 139 near Tulelake
State Route 163
Ash Street in Downtown San Diego to I-8 in San Diego
Cabrillo Freeway, a landscaped parkway through Balboa Park in San Diego
Designated April 24, 1992, in San Diego County: Balboa Park
State Route 166
US 101 near Santa Maria to SR 33 near Cuyama
State Route 168
SR 65  near Clovis to Huntington Lake
Camp Sabrina to SR 266 at Oasis
Part of the Ancient Bristlecone Scenic Byway (also a National Forest Scenic Byway), scenic drive through the eastern side of the Sierra Nevada
Designated June 19, 1970, in Inyo County: Camp Sabrina to Bishop
State Route 173
SR 138 in Hesperia to SR 18 near Lake Arrowhead
State Route 174
Bear River to Grass Valley
State Route 178
Death Valley National Park to SR 127 near Shoshone
State Route 180
SR 65  near Minkler to Kings Canyon 
Part of the Kings Canyon Scenic Byway (also a National Forest Scenic Byway), scenic drive through the Sierra Nevada to Kings Canyon National Park
Designated October 15, 2015, in Fresno County: near Minkler to Tulare County
Designated October 15, 2015, in Tulare County: Fresno County to near General Grant Grove
Designated October 15, 2015, in Fresno County: near General Grant Grove to Kings Canyon
State Route 190 
SR 65 in Porterville to SR 127 at Death Valley Junction
Death Valley Scenic Byway (also a National Scenic Byway), scenic drive through Death Valley National Park, the lowest place in North America, surrounded by mountains
Designated May 10, 1968, in Inyo County: Death Valley National Park (original boundaries)
Designated January 7, 2002, in Inyo County: Death Valley National Park (new boundaries)
State Route 197
US 199 near Hiouchi to US 101 near Smith River
State Route 198
US 101 near San Lucas to I-5 near Coalinga
SR 99 near Goshen to Sequoia National Park
U.S. Route 199
US 101 near Crescent City to Oregon
State Route 203
Minaret Summit to US 395 near Mammoth Lakes
State Route 209 
Point Loma to I-5 in San Diego
Interstate 210/State Route 210
I-5 in Sylmar to SR 134 in Pasadena
SR 330 San Bernardinoto I-10 in Redlands
State Route 221
SR 29 near Napa to SR 121 in Napa
State Route 236
SR 9 at Boulder Creek to SR 9 at Waterman Gap
State Route 239 
I-580 near Tracy to SR 4 near Brentwood
State Route 243
SR 74 at Mountain Center to I-10 in Banning
Part of the Pines to Palms Scenic Byway (also a National Forest Scenic Byway), scenic drive from the ridge of the San Bernardino Mountains to the San Bernardino Valley
Designated March 21, 1972, in Riverside County: SR 74 at Mountain Center to Banning
State Route 247
SR 62 in Yucca Valley to I-15 in Barstow
State Route 251 
SR 37 near Nicasio to SR 1 near Point Reyes Station
State Route 254
US 101 near Phillipsville to US 101 near Stafford
State Route 266
Nevada east of Oasis to SR 168 at Oasis
Interstate 280 
I-880/SR 17 in San Jose to I-80 in San Francisco
Junipero Serra Freeway, nicknamed as the "World's Most Beautiful Freeway", scenic route through the hills of the San Francisco Peninsula
Designated April 28, 1980, in San Mateo County: Santa Clara County to South San Francisco
State Route 299
US 101 in Arcata to SR 96 at Willow Creek
SR 3 at Weaverville to I-5 in Redding
SR 89 near Burney to SR 139 near Canby
State Route 330
SR 210 San Bernardino to SR 18 at Running Springs
U.S. Route 395
SR 14 near Little Lake to SR 89 near Coleville
Route 395, runs through the Owens Valley and high desert meadows, with views of the ranges and peaks of the Eastern Sierra Nevada
Designated June 30, 1970, in Inyo County: Independence to Fish Springs
Designated June 5, 2000, in Mono County: Inyo County to near Crowley Lake
Designated November 9, 1971, in Mono County: near Crowley Lake to near Mammoth Lakes
Designated June 5, 2000, in Mono County: near Mammoth Lakes to SR 120 near Mono Lake
Designated June 5, 2000, in Mono County: Lee Vining to Bridgeport
Designated June 5, 2000, in Mono County: Bridgeport to Walker
Interstate 580
I-5 near Tracy to I-80 in Oakland
Route 580, traverses the eastern edge of the Coast Ranges and the western edge of the Central Valley
Designated June 7, 1974, in San Joaquin County: I-5 near Tracy to Alameda County
Designated February 18, 1970, in Alameda County: San Joaquin County to I-205 near Tracy
MacArthur Freeway, scenic landscaped route through Oakland
Designated June 25, 1976, in Alameda County: San Leandro to I-980/SR 24 in Oakland
Interstate 680
Milpitas to SR 24 in Walnut Creek
Route 680, crosses wooded hills and valleys of the Coast Ranges
Designated June 15, 1978, in Alameda County: SR 238 in Fremont to Bernal Avenue in Pleasanton
Designated October 22, 1982, in Alameda County: Bernal Avenue in Pleasanton to Contra Costa County
Designated October 22, 1982, in Contra Costa County: Alameda County to SR 24 in Walnut Creek

Designated county highways

County Route A18
Lake Boulevard, scenic drive overlooking Shasta Lake
Designated 1981 in Shasta County: Whiskeytown-Shasta-Trinity National Recreation Area
County Route G14
Nacimiento Lake Drive and Interlake Road, travels through the foothills of the Santa Lucia Range in the vicinity of Lake Nacimiento and Lake San Antonio
Designated 1981 in San Luis Obispo County: Chimney Rock Road near Paso Robles to Monterey County
Designated 1971 in Monterey County: San Luis Obispo County to CR G18 (Jolon Road) at Lockwood
County Route G20
Laureles Grade, a steep, winding scenic road between Carmel Valley Village and Monterey
Designated 1969 in Monterey County: Carmel Valley Road to SR 68 near Monterey
County Route N1
Malibu Canyon Road and Las Virgenes Road, traverses Malibu Canyon and the Santa Monica Mountains
Designated 2002 in Los Angeles County: SR 1 in Malibu to Lost Hills Road in Calabasas
Mulholland Highway
The western segment of Mulholland Highway through the Santa Monica Mountains from Leo Carrillo State Park to Rocky Oaks
Designated 2002 in Los Angeles County: SR 1 at Leo Carrillo State Park to CR N9 (Kanan Dume Road) near Cornell
The segment of Mulholland Highway through Malibu Creek State Park 
Designated 2002 in Los Angeles County: Cornell Road to Las Virgenes Road
River Road
The segment of River Road not signed as part of SR 160 that runs along the Sacramento River in the Sacramento–San Joaquin River Delta. Includes a portion of County Route E13.
Designated 1969 in Sacramento County: SR 160 near Isleton to SR 160 near Paintersville

See also

References

External links
 Caltrans: Scenic Highways

 
 Scenic
 Scenic Highways
State highways
Tourist attractions in California